Ahmadiyya School may refer to one of over 500 primary and secondary schools, particularly those in West Africa. In particular, it may refer to:

T.I. Ahmadiyya Girls Senior High School, Asokore
T.I. Ahmadiyya Senior High School, Kumasi
T.I. Ahmadiyya Secondary School, Freetown
Ahmadhiyya International School, Maldives (unaffiliated with the Ahmadiyya movement)